The 2011 BFA Senior League was the fourth season of the league playing in its then-current format, which involves the top teams from the Grand Bahama and New Providence Soccer Leagues. Previously, the league had been a tournament between the top teams of each island, but became the top level of Bahamian football.

The competition featured the winners of the New Providence Football League and the Grand Bahamas Football League to determine the top club in The Bahamas, as well as the nation's qualifier for the CFU Club Championship.

IM Bears FC are the defending league champions.

Teams

Table

References

External links
BFA Senior League via FIFA.com

BFA Senior League seasons
Bahamas
BFA Senior League